HD 92036 is a single star in the equatorial constellation of Hydra. Its apparent magnitude is 4.87. This is an aging red giant star on the asymptotic giant branch with a stellar classification of M1III:Ba0.5.

References 

M-type giants
Hydra (constellation)
Durchmusterung objects
092036
051979
4162